Kenneth Henry Landenberger (July 29, 1928 – July 28, 1960) was an American professional baseball player and manager. Landenbeger played 11 seasons (1948–58) of minor league baseball and managed in the minors for three full seasons and part of a fourth. In his only Major League Baseball service, he appeared in two games as a first baseman and pinch hitter over a nine-day period for the  Chicago White Sox, batted five times, and had one single — off Dick Littlefield of the St. Louis Browns in his final MLB plate appearance.

He graduated from Charles F. Brush High School in his native Lyndhurst, Ohio, and attended Ohio University. He batted an even .300 in 1,389 games played (with 1,512 hits) during his minor league career, spent mostly in the White Sox system. He batted over .300 seven times and four times hit 25 or more home runs. But after his 1952 trial, he never returned to the Majors.

Landenberger became a minor league manager in 1957 and joined the Cleveland Indians' system the following year, managing teams at the Class C and D levels. He began the 1960 campaign as skipper of the Selma Cloverleafs of the Alabama–Florida League, but he was sent home in mid-July after a medical examination revealed that he was suffering from acute leukemia. He entered the Cleveland Clinic, but died on July 28, the day before his 32nd birthday, from a cerebral hemorrhage and the effects of leukemia.

References

External links

1928 births
1960 deaths
Baseball players from Ohio
Chicago White Sox players
Colorado Springs Sky Sox (WL) players
Deaths from cancer in Ohio
Deaths from leukemia
Major League Baseball first basemen
Memphis Chickasaws players
Minot Mallards players
Nashville Vols players
Ohio University alumni
People from Lyndhurst, Ohio
Sioux City Soos players
Sportspeople from Cuyahoga County, Ohio
Superior Blues players
Wisconsin Rapids White Sox players